Mehmet Şenol Şişli, also known as MŞŞ, is a Turkish songwriter, bass guitarist, vocalist, and poet. He and electric guitarist Selim Öztürk founded Kargo, one of the first and most known Turkish rock bands. 

Şişli left the band in 2000. As of 2006, he performed in the band Kesmeşeker as the bassist. He re-joined Kargo in 2009. He has also published two poetry books named Şua and Bahar Artıkları and one music demo Köpekleri Saymazsan. He wrote all of the lyrics in the Kargo album, Yalnızlık Mevsimi, which is counted as a milestone in Turkish rock music. He wrote most of the lyrics of Kargo's songs.

References

External links
Personal website 

Turkish bass guitarists
Rock bass guitarists
Turkish rock musicians
Year of birth missing (living people)
Living people